Nick Burley (May 17, 1875 – March 5, 1911) was an American boxer of Croatian descent (from Boljenovići, Pelješac peninsula) His boxing career from 1890 until 1907. In 1902 he defeated Frank "Paddy" Slavin to win the Heavyweight Championship of the Yukon Territory. The March 6, 1911 Tacoma, Washington Daily News reported that Burley died of a heart attack on Western Avenue, in Seattle, Washington.

See also
List of bare-knuckle boxers

External links
Burley's Record at Cyber Boxing Zone

References

1875 births
1911 deaths
Boxers from Nevada
Bare-knuckle boxers
American people of Croatian descent
American male boxers
Heavyweight boxers